"Yee Haw" is  a  song co-written and recorded by American country music artist Jake Owen. It was released in February 2006 as his debut single and the first from his debut album Startin' with Me. The song peaked at number 16 on the US Billboard Hot Country Songs chart, and reached number 83 on the Billboard Hot 100. Owen wrote this song with Casey Beathard and Kendell Marvel.

Content
The song is an up-tempo party anthem in which Owen highlights the various events at a party in a bar.

Critical reception
Mason Stewart of AllMusic described the song as "try[ing] so desperately hard to establish Owen's image as a bad-ass hellraiser that [it] finally become[s] comical". In 2017, Billboard contributor Chuck Dauphin put "Yee Haw" at number five on his top 10 list of Owen's best songs.

Music video
The music video was directed by Wes Edwards and premiered in early 2006.

Chart performance
"Yee Haw" debuted at number 60 on the U.S. Billboard Hot Country Songs for the week of March 11, 2006.

References

2006 songs
2006 debut singles
Jake Owen songs
Songs written by Casey Beathard
Songs written by Kendell Marvel
Songs written by Jake Owen
RCA Records singles
Music videos directed by Wes Edwards